Dannie Mark Bulman (born 24 January 1979) is an English former professional footballer who played as a midfielder. He played in the English Football League with Wycombe Wanderers, Oxford United, Crawley Town and AFC Wimbledon. Prior to retiring, Bulman was the oldest active player in the English Football League; he is the current host of a daytime show entitled Talk Of The Town.

Bulman started his senior career at Ashford Town, before joining Second Division side Wycombe Wanderers in 1998, where he would remain for six years before being released in 2004. Following his release by Wycombe Wanderers, Bulman joined Stevenage Borough, where he would remain for two full seasons before joining Crawley Town on loan in September 2006 and later on a permanent deal in January 2007.

After two-and-a-half seasons at Crawley, he joined Oxford United in the summer of 2009, and was promoted to League Two in his first season at the club following victory in the Conference Premier play-off Final against York City. Bulman returned to Crawley on loan in September 2010, before signing on a permanent basis in January 2011, as Crawley would get promoted to the Football League for the first time in their history that season. He joined AFC Wimbledon in 2014, helping the club win promotion to League One via the play-offs in 2016, before returning to Crawley Town in 2017.

Career

Early career
Bulman was born in Ashford in Surrey. He made his senior debut for Ashford Town at the age of 15 before spending a further four years at the club.

Wycombe Wanderers
Having had a trial period with the club in February 1998, Bulman joined Wycombe Wanderers in the summer of 1998 for a fee of £10,000. Bulman made his debut as a late substitute in a 1–1 draw at home to Bristol Rovers on 31 August 1998, and within 15 seconds of coming on the pitch, he scored as Lee Jones' clearance had deflected off his buttocks and into the net. Bulman went on to make a further 10 appearances for the club across the 1998–99 season. Bulman spent six years at the club and played in an FA Cup semi-final against Liverpool in 2001.

Stevenage Borough and Crawley Town
He transferred to non-league Stevenage Borough in 2004 after his contract at Wycombe Wanderers expired. Bulman's competitive debut for Stevenage came on 14 August 2004, playing the entirety of a 3–1 defeat away to Dagenham & Redbridge on 14 August 2004.

He joined Crawley on a three-month loan in September 2006, with a recall clause after 30 days. His debut for the club came as a substitute on 2 September 2006 in a 2–0 defeat at home to Northwich Victoria. After making 15 league appearances on loan at Crawley, scoring thrice, he left Stevenage after his contract was cancelled by mutual consent in early December 2007. Bulman joined Crawley Town on a permanent basis in January 2007.

Oxford United and return to Crawley Town

He signed for Oxford United in May 2009 on a two-year contract. He made his competitive debut for the club on 8 August 2009 in a 2–1 home victory against York City on 8 August 2009. Bulman made 42 appearances across the regular season with Oxford United, winning the Players' Player of the Year award, as they finished third and qualified for the Conference play-offs. Bulman appearedin both legs of the play-off semi-final as they defeated Rushden & Diamonds 3–1 on aggregate, prior to Bulman starting in Oxford's 3–1 victory over York City in the final, resulting in promotion to League Two.

After eight appearances for Oxford in all competitions during the 2010–11 season, he returned to Crawley Town on a three-month-long loan in September 2010. In response to his return to the club, manager Steve Evans said that he was 'delighted he wanted to come back here'. In January 2011, he agreed to sign permanently for Crawley on a free transfer, with the contract lasting until summer 2012. Bulman's first appearance of this spell with Crawley came on 1 January 2011 in a 3–1 victory at home to Eastbourne Borough. He won promotion to the Football League with Crawley after they won the Conference in the 2010–11 season, whilst they also reached the fifth round of the FA Cup, before being knocked out by Manchester United. He made 37 appearances in all competitions for Crawlry across both spells at the club during the 2010–11 season.

The 2011–12 season saw Crawley promoted again, this time to League One as they finished 3rd in League Two. Bulman appeared in 48 matches across all competitions and scored three goals.

AFC Wimbledon
In June 2014, Bulman signed for AFC Wimbledon on a free transfer. He made his debut for the club in their first match of the season, starting in a 2–2 draw at home to Shrewsbury Town on 9 August 2014.

He played for Wimbledon in the 2016 Football League Two play-off Final as they won 2–0 and were promoted to League One for the first time in their history. He agreed a new deal with the club in May 2016.

Despite winning the club's Players' Player of the Year award, he was released by Wimbledon at the end of the 2016–17 season.

Bulman was selected as part of AFC Wimbledon's team of the decade for the 2010s.

Second return to Crawley Town
He returned to Crawley in 2017, and was offered a new contract at the end of the 2017–18 season. In June 2019, at the age of 40, Bulman was offered another one-year contract by Crawley; at that point he was the oldest active player in the English Football League, ahead of Kevin Ellison, Aaron Wilbraham and James Coppinger. At the end of the 2019–20 season, he was offered a new contract by the club, which he agreed to, signing a one-year contract extension as part of a player-coach arrangement. On 2 April 2022, Bulman announced his retirement from professional football at the age of 43.

Style of play
Bulman generally plays as a central midfielder, but can also play as a defensive midfielder. Bulman was also known for his determination as a player. In January 2019, then manager of Crawley Town Gabriele Cioffi praised Bulman's fitness despite his age, stating that 'his performances are always competitive' and that 'he's an all-in player'.

Career statistics

Honours
Oxford United
Conference Premier play-offs: 2010

Crawley Town
Conference Premier: 2010–11

AFC Wimbledon
Football League Two play-offs: 2016

References

External links

1979 births
Living people
People from Ashford, Surrey
Footballers from Surrey
English footballers
Association football midfielders
Ashford Town (Middlesex) F.C. players
Wycombe Wanderers F.C. players
Stevenage F.C. players
Crawley Town F.C. players
Oxford United F.C. players
AFC Wimbledon players
English Football League players
National League (English football) players
Crawley Town F.C. non-playing staff